Hermann Roßmann (15 February 1902 – 3 March 1985) was a German writer. His work was part of the literature event in the art competition at the 1928 Summer Olympics.

References

1902 births
1985 deaths
20th-century German male writers
Olympic competitors in art competitions
People from Berlin